Joya Misra is Professor of Sociology and Public Policy, University of Massachusetts, Amherst.

Early life and education 
Misra earned her bachelor's degree in Religion from Centenary College of Louisiana in 1988, and her Ph.D. in Sociology from Emory University in 1994. She is a second-generation immigrant who grew up in the South.

Academic career 
Professor Misra joined the Department of Sociology at the University of Georgia in 1994, where she was affiliated with Women’s Studies. In 1999, she joined the Department of Sociology and Center for Public Policy & Administration at the University of Massachusetts, with affiliations with the Women, Gender, and Sexuality Studies Department and Labor Studies program. In 2009, she was promoted to Professor of Sociology and Public Policy at the university. She has served as interim Sociology Department Chair and the Graduate Program Director, as well as Director of the Institute for Social Science Research and Director of ADVANCE Programming.

Organizations 
Misra is the President-Elect of the American Sociological Association. Prior to her election in 2022, she served several leadership roles for the ASA, including Vice President, Council Member, Chair of the ASA Distinguished Book Committee, Chair of the Sex and Gender Section, and Chair of the Race, Gender, and Class Section. From 2011 to 2015, Misra was the editor of Gender & Society.

Major works 

The intersection of gender and race in the labor market

In her 2003 article co-authored with Irene Browne, Misra identifies how the intersection of race and gender shape the US labor market, including wage inequality; discrimination and stereotyping; and immigration and domestic labor, establishing intersectionality as a foundational perspective to understand labor market inequalities.

Misra’s scholarship focuses on inequalities by gender and gender identity, race, class, ethnicity, sexuality, nationality, citizenship, parenthood status and educational level. Much of her work considers how policies may both reinforce and lessen inequalities. Her research on work-family policies uses a cross-national perspective, with a focus on ways that social policies can entrench or remediate existing inequalities. Her collaborative work further considers how culture intersects with structure, to explain where and when policies are most effective. 

With Kyla Walters, she published a book that focuses on how retail work is organized in the 21st century. This work explores how race, gender, and class condition workers' experiences with managers, co-workers, and customers. It also considers more deeply how race and gender shape the aesthetic labor that retail clothing workers must do. 

Her work has appeared in the American Sociological Review, American Journal of Sociology, Gender & Society, Social Problems, and numerous other publications, including many works published with current and former students. Misra is deeply committed to publicly engaged research, and she aims to leverage research to foster more equitable societies. She has written for and been quoted in many publications and media outlets, including the New York Times, the Atlantic, BBC, the Chronicle of Higher Education.

Awards and honors 
Joya Misra’s numerous awards include the Eastern Sociological Society Public Sociology Award (2022), the Roy J. Zuckerberg Endowed Leadership Chair (2022-2024), the University of Massachusetts Samuel F. Conti Faculty Fellowship (2020-21), and the University of Massachusetts Chancellor’s Leadership Fellow (2016-17). Misra's research has been supported by grants from the National Science Foundation. In 2009 she won the inaugural World Bank/Luxembourg Income Study Gender Research Award.

Misra is a celebrated teacher and mentor, receiving the Sociologists for Women in Society Mentoring Award in 2010. At the University of Massachusetts, she was awarded the College of Social and Behavioral Sciences Outstanding Teaching Award (2004-05) and the Sociology Mentoring Award (2009-10, 2014-15).

Select publications 
Books

Misra, Joya and Kyla Walters. 2022. Walking Mannequins: How Race and Gender Inequalities Shape Retail Clothing Work. Berkeley, CA: University of California Press.

Thomas Janoski, Cedric de Leon, Joya Misra, and Isaac Martin. (Eds.) The New Handbook of Political Sociology. Cambridge: Cambridge University Press. 

Joya Misra, Mahala Dyer Stewart, Marni Alyson Brown. (Eds.) 2017. Gendered Lives, Sexual Beings. Thousand Oaks, CA: Sage.

Dan Clawson, Robert Zussman, Joya Misra, Naomi Gerstel, Randall Stokes, and Doug Anderton (Eds.). 2007. Public Sociology: 15 Eminent Sociologists Debate Politics and the Profession in the 21stCentury. Berkeley, CA: U of California Press.

Journal articles

 Browne, Irene and Joya Misra. 2003. “The Intersection of Gender and Race in Labor Markets.” Annual Review of Sociology. 29: 487-513. http://www.jstor.org/stable/30036977
 Budig, Michelle, Joya Misra, and Irene Böckmann. 2012. “The Motherhood Wage Penalty in Cross-National Perspective: The Importance of Work-Family Policies and Cultural Attitudes?” Social Politics. 19(2): 163-193. https://doi.org/10.1093/sp/jxs006
 Misra, Joya, Abby Templer, and Jennifer Lundquist. 2012. “Gender, Work-Time, and Care Responsibility among Faculty.” Sociological Forum. 29(2): 300-323.  https://doi.org/10.1111/j.1573-7861.2012.01319.x 
 Hicks, Alexander and Joya Misra. 1993. “Political Resources and the Growth of Welfare in Affluent Capitalist Democracies, 1960-1982.” American Journal of Sociology. 99:668-710.  https://doi.org/10.1086/230320 
 Boeckmann, Irene, Joya Misra, and Michelle Budig. 2015. “Cultural and Institutional Factors Shaping Mothers' Employment and Working Hours in Postindustrial Countries.” Social Forces. 93(4) 1301-1333.  https://doi.org/10.1093/sf/sou119
 Misra, Joya, Stephanie Moller, and Michelle Budig. 2007. “Work-Family Policies and Poverty for Partnered and Single Women in Europe and North America.” Gender & Society. 21: 804-827.  https://doi.org/10.1177/0891243207308445
 Misra, Joya, Celeste Vaughan Curington,  and Venus Mary Green. 2021. “Methods of Intersectional Research.” Sociological Spectrum. 41(1)9-28.  https://doi.org/10.1080/02732173.2020.1791772

External Links 
Joya Misra at Google Scholar
Personal Website
Curriculum Vitae

References 

Year of birth missing (living people)
Living people